Orchidales is an order of flowering plants. In taxonomical systems, this is a relatively recent name as early systems used descriptive botanical names for the order containing the orchids. The Bentham & Hooker and the Engler systems had the orchids in order Microspermae while the Wettstein system treats them as order Gynandrae. Circumscription of the order will vary with the taxonomic system being used. Although mostly the order will consist of the orchids only (usually in one family only, but sometimes divided into more families, as in the Dahlgren system, see below), sometimes other families are added:

Circumscription in the Takhtajan system
Takhtajan system:

 order Orchidales
 family Orchidaceae

Circumscription in the Cronquist system
Cronquist system (1981):

 order Orchidales
 family Geosiridaceae
 family Burmanniaceae
 family Corsiaceae
 family Orchidaceae

Circumscription in the Dahlgren system
Dahlgren system:

 order Orchidales
 family Neuwiediaceae
 family Apostasiaceae
 family Cypripediaceae
 family Orchidaceae

Circumscription in the Thorne system
Thorne system (1992):

 order Orchidales
 family Orchidaceae

APG system
The order is not recognized in the APG II system, which assigns the orchids to order Asparagales.

See also
 Taxonomy of the orchid family

Monocots
Historically recognized angiosperm orders